Judyth Watson  (born 8 March 1940) is an Australian former politician.

Early life
Watson was born in Burton-on-Trent, England to Cecil and Hylda Watson in 1940. She emigrated to Australia in 1949 and went to school at Perth Modern School. After working as a nurse, Watson completed a Bachelor of Science degree in 1977. In 1981 she completed a PhD studying workers compensation.

Political career
In 1986 Watson was elected to the Western Australian Legislative Assembly for the electorate of Canning. On election she and Carmen Lawrence were the first female members of the WA Parliament to hold a PhD.

Watson was appointed as Minister for Aboriginal Affairs; Multicultural and Ethnic Affairs; and Seniors in February 1991 under Premier Carmen Lawrence. She was appointed Minister for Women's Interests in September 1992. She served in Cabinet until February 1993.

When the electorate was dissolved in 1989 she was elected to the electorate of Kenwick. After serving two terms, the seat was abolished and she unsuccessfully stood for the new electorate of Southern River.

Watson was awarded the Medal of the Order of Australia (OAM) in the 2019 Queen's Birthday Honours for "service to the community of Western Australia, and to social justice".

References

1940 births
Australian nurses
Members of the Western Australian Legislative Assembly
Naturalised citizens of Australia
People educated at Perth Modern School
English emigrants to Australia
People from Burton upon Trent
Living people
Australian women nurses
Women members of the Western Australian Legislative Assembly
Recipients of the Medal of the Order of Australia